We the People is a board wargame about the American Revolution, published by Avalon Hill in 1993 and designed by Mark Herman. We the People was the first wargame to use cards as the primary way to control the pace and tempo of play, with a strong element of fog of war through the hidden card information. This started a new genre of wargames that have emphasized competitive play and a strong historical narrative.

Influence
The card-driven and point-to-point system pioneered by Mark Herman in We the People has been implemented in a number of subsequent games, including For the People which was a sequel.

GMT Games has produced a number of games implementing this system, including The Napoleonic Wars, Here I Stand, Virgin Queen, Twilight Struggle, and upcoming Tanto Manta.

Gameplay

One player represents the interests of the British, the other the Continentals/Americans.  The game board for We the People represents the portion of the 13 American colonies and Canada in which the American Revolutionary War primarily took place.  The map shows a web of cities and towns connected by lines along which armies can move.  Each player’s objective is to control a majority of colonies by occupying city and town spaces with political control markers.  During each one-year turn of the game, players alternate playing strategy cards.  These allow use of operations points or special events to affect the political and military situations.

Players field armies consisting of manpower points which are led by historical generals (represented by vertical game pieces bearing a general’s image and stats).  When armies battle, players are dealt cards from a separate battle deck - each card represents a tactical military maneuver and its counter, i.e. “Flank Attack Left / Refuse Right Flank”.  Each round of battle, the attacker plays a card which the defender must match with his/her own identical card or else the defender loses.  After each round, if the defender has survived, he/she rolls a die to attempt to become the attacker for subsequent rounds of combat, with better generals having a greater chance of passing the die roll.  Although armies are useful tools for maintaining political control, military dominance does not necessarily assure victory, a game concept which mirrors the historical failure of the British Expeditionary Force to pacify the rebellion.

References

External links

American Revolutionary War board wargames
Avalon Hill games
Board games introduced in 1993